Tekeli railway station is a railway station on the Southern Line of the IZBAN commuter rail system, just south of Tekeli, Turkey. The station was built between 2014–15 and opened to passenger service on 6 February 2016.

Connections
ESHOT operates regional bus service, accessible from the station.

References

Railway stations in İzmir Province
Railway stations opened in 2016